The 1944 United States presidential election in California took place on November 7, 1944 as part of the 1944 United States presidential election. State voters chose 25 representatives, or electors, to the Electoral College, who voted for president and vice president.

California voted for the Democratic incumbent, Franklin Roosevelt, in a landslide over the Republican challenger, New York Governor Thomas E. Dewey.

Results

Results by county

References

California
1944
1944 California elections